The 2011 Craven District Council election took place on 5 May 2011 to elect members of Craven District Council in North Yorkshire, England. One third of the council was up for election and the Conservative party stayed in overall control of the council.

After the election, the composition of the council was as follows:
Conservative 18
Independent 8
Liberal Democrats 4

Election result
There was no change in the political composition of the council after the election, with the Conservatives retaining a majority. All nine councillors who were defending seats held them, with the closest result being in Skipton West where Liberal Democrat Polly English held the seat with a majority of 7 votes over Conservative candidate David Walsh. The only new councillor after the election came in Gargrave and Malhamdale, where Conservative Simon Myers held the seat previously held by party colleague David Crawford, who stood down at the election.

The results meant the Conservatives retained 18 seats and there were 8 independent and 4 Liberal Democrat councillors following the election, while Labour did not win any seats despite standing in 8 of the 10 seats contested.

Ward results

References

2011
2011 English local elections
2010s in North Yorkshire